The Second Bay Tradition (or Second Bay Area Tradition) is an architectural style from the period of 1928 through 1942 that was rooted in San Francisco and the greater Bay Area. Also referred to as "redwood post and beam", the style is characterized by a rustic, woodsy philosophy and features sleek lines and machine aesthetic.  Associated with European Modernism, the architects Gardner Dailey, William Merchant, Henry Hill, and William Wurster designed in the style. A repository of drawings and specifications from the tradition are housed at the Environmental Design Archives at the University of California, Berkeley.

See also
 First Bay Tradition
 Third Bay Tradition

References

Bay Tradition, Second
.
Bay Tradition, Second
Bay Tradition, Second